Anges Football Club is a Togolese football club based in Notsé. They play in the top division in Togolese football. 1,000 capacity Stade des Anges is their home.

Achievements
Togolese Championnat National
Champion (1 title): 2013

External links
Team profile – soccerway.com

Football clubs in Togo